List of radio stations in Georgia may refer to:

 List of radio stations in Georgia (country)
 List of radio stations in Georgia (U.S. state)